Nanosesarma is a genus of crabs belonging to the family Sesarmidae.

The species of this genus are found mostly on the coasts of Indian Ocean.

Species:
 Nanosesarma andersoni (de Man, 1888) 
 Nanosesarma batavicum (Moreira, 1903)

References

Grapsoidea
Decapod genera